Mirosław Okoński (born 8 December 1958 in Koszalin) is a Polish former professional footballer who played as an attacking midfielder.

Club career
Okoński started his football career in 1969, in the second division of the Polish league with the team of his hometown, Gwardia Koszalin, which he played to until 1977. He then moved to the first division and Lech Poznań. In 1980 he was transferred to Lech Poznań with which he won the Polish Cup in 1980 and 1981, while from 1982 to 1986 he returned to Lech Poznań. During his career in Poland he was the top scorer once, in 1983, and twice the runner-up in the league. In 1983 and 1984 he won back-to-back championships with Lech Poznan. In 1982 and 1984 he also won the Polish Cup. In 1986, he was transferred for around DM 700,000 to German side, Hamburger SV. He played there for the next two years and won the DFB-Pokal in 1987 and in the same year they finished second in the league. They played in the 1987 DFB-Supercup losing  2–1 from Bayern Munich with Okoński scoring the only goal for his club. During his stay there, he was named Best Foreign Player in Bundesliga.

It was the summer of 1988, he moved to the Greek league to play for AEK Athens in a transfer of 220 million drachmas. Anderlecht, Paris Saint-Germain, Monaco and Olympiacos were also very interested in the footballer, with the latter ending up with Lajos Détári instead. In his first season at the club, he won the league being the team's top scorer and essentially their leader. He scored with a direct free kick against Panathinaikos and gave his team the victory in the away derby. In May 7, 1989 in an away match against Olympiacos at the Olympic Stadium, he combined 2 times with Karagiozopoulos, assisting him in one of the most important goals in AEK's history. The following season was also very good winning the Greek Super Cup on penalties against Panathinaikos. On the contrary in his last season at AEK, affected both by the bad state of the club and by the rupture of his relations with the then coach Dušan Bajević, he did not performed as expected and left before the end of the season.

In 1991 he was transferred to Korinthos, who had just been promoted to the first division and played for six months, before he leaves the team and thecountry, at 33 years old. In 1992, at the end of his career, he returned to his homeland playing a few games initially with Lech Poznan, later champions, and ending the season with Olimpia Poznań. The following year he returned to Germany and played with SC Concordia von 1907, while in 1994 with FTSV Raspo Elmshorn in the 5th division of the German Championship. He returned to his country in 1995 and joined Lipno Stęszew and a year later his first team Gwardia Koszalin. In the last years of his career he faced problems in his off-field life with alcohol and gambling.

International career
Okoński played 29 times for the Poland national football team, from 1977 to 1987, without participating in any major international tournament and scored 2 goals.

After football
He currently lives in Poland and has occasionally worked as a player manager and as a newspaper columnist.

Honours

Legia Warsaw
Polish Cup: 1979–80, 1980–81

Lech Poznań
Ekstraklasa: 1982–83, 1983–84
Polish Cup: 1981–82, 1983–84
Polish Super Cup: 1992

Hamburger SV
DFB-Pokal: 1986–87

AEK Athens
Alpha Ethniki: 1988–89
Greek League Cup: 1990
Greek Super Cup: 1989

Individual
Ekstraklasa top scorer: 1982–83

References

External links

1958 births
Living people
Association football forwards
Polish footballers
Poland international footballers
Polish expatriate footballers
AEK Athens F.C. players
Korinthos F.C. players
Hamburger SV players
Lech Poznań players
Legia Warsaw players
Expatriate footballers in Greece
Bundesliga players
Super League Greece players
Ekstraklasa players
People from Koszalin
Sportspeople from West Pomeranian Voivodeship